Serbian Muslims are adherents of Islam in Serbia.

The term Serbian Muslims may also refer to:

 Muslim Serbs, ethnic Serbs who are adherents of Islam
 Ethnic Muslims in Serbia, distinctive minority of ethnic Muslims in Serbia

See also 
 Bosnian Muslims (disambiguation)
 Croatian Muslims (disambiguation)